Vadu Săpat is a commune in Prahova County, Muntenia, Romania. It is composed of three villages: Ghinoaica, Ungureni, and Vadu Săpat. Until 2004, these belonged to Fântânele Commune, when they were split off to form a separate commune.

References

Communes in Prahova County
Localities in Muntenia